Marian Cristinel Șerban (born 7 July 2000) is a Romanian professional footballer who plays as a midfielder for CSM Slatina, on loan from Chindia Târgoviște.

Career Statistics

Club

References

External links
 
 

2000 births
Living people
Sportspeople from Craiova
Romanian footballers
Romania youth international footballers
Association football midfielders
Liga I players
CS Universitatea Craiova players
LPS HD Clinceni players
AFC Chindia Târgoviște players
Liga II players
CS Mioveni players
CSM Slatina footballers